You Can't Say No is a 2018 American comedy film directed by Paul Kramer and starring Marguerite Moreau, Hamish Linklater, Hus Miller (who also served as producer and screenwriter), Julie Carmen and Peter Fonda.

Premise
Just days from signing divorce papers. Hank and Alexandra give their relationship one final shot by playing a game with only one rule. The rule being "No matter what they ask each other to do, they can't say no".

Cast
 Marguerite Moreau as Alex
 Peter Fonda as Buck
 William Shockley as Will
 Gus Miller as Angus Murphy
 Hamish Linklater as Miles
 Julie Carmen as Matilda

Production
Filming occurred in Sonoma County, California.

Release
The film made its worldwide premiere at the Cinequest Film Festival at the California Theatre in San Jose, California on March 3, 2018.

Reception
Bradley Gibson of Film Threat gave the film a 8 out of 10.

References

External links
 
 
 

American comedy films
Films shot in California
2018 films
2018 comedy films
2010s English-language films
2010s American films